The Marshal of Windy Hollow is a 1972 American Western film directed by Jerry Whittington and starring Sunset Carson.  The film is unique in that it reunites several well-known B movie actors from 1940s Westerns for one last outing.

Plot
The plot is standard Western B movie fare. The Marshal of Windy Hollow (Sunset Carson) teams up with a Texas Ranger (Ken Maynard) to stop a band of outlaws who are preying on innocent settlers and stealing their gold.

Cast 
Sunset Carson as the Marshal
Ken Maynard as the Texas Ranger
Tex Ritter as the Mayor
Tex Barr as Bull
Bill Cody, Jr. as Indian Chief
Buster Jones as the Outlaw

Film's whereabouts
The Marshal of Windy Hollow was filmed as a true B Western and wrapped up after 12 days of shooting.  It is reportedly an action-packed Western in the style of the classic B movies of the 1930s and 1940s.  However, the film was never released to the public and today its whereabouts are unknown.
In 2012, the undeveloped film turned up in Texas after an estate sale but again, current location is still unknown.

See also
 List of American films of 1972

External links

The Marshal of Windy Hollow at B Westerns

1972 films
1972 Western (genre) films
Unreleased American films
American Western (genre) films
1970s English-language films
1970s American films